Wearable may refer to:
 Clothing
 Wearable technology
 Wearable computer
 Activity tracker